Koto & Flute is an album by koto player Kimio Eto with flautist Bud Shank released on the World Pacific label.

Reception

In a review for AllMusic, Ken Dryden states: "fans of traditional Japanese music and those familiar with Shank's jazz recordings will enjoy this gorgeous album".

Track listing
 "Haru No Umi (Suite) Part 1: Haru No Umi" (Michio Miyagi) 	
 "Haru No Umi (Suite) Part 2: Haru No Otozure" (Miyagi)
 "Haru No Umi (Suite) Part 3: Tanima No Suisha" (Miyagi) 
 "Joyo Kaze" (Kimio Eto)
 "March" (Tokichi Setoguchi) 
 "Chi Doi" (Kengyo Yoshizawa)
 "Yach-io Jishi" (Yoshizawa)
 "Yoro Kobi" (Eto)
 "Lullaby (3 Variations)" (Traditional)

Personnel 
Kimio Eto - koto
Bud Shank - flute

References 

1960 albums
World Pacific Records albums
Bud Shank albums